All That She Wants is a Canadian drama film, directed by Denis Côté and released in 2008. The film centres on Coralie (Eve Duranceau), a young girl living with her stepfather Jacob (Normand Lévesque), who keeps her isolated for her protection due to his criminal past; however, Coralie is preparing to rebel against her circumstances.

The film's cast also includes Laurent Lucas, Nicolas Canuel, Réjean Lefrançois and Olivier Aubin.

The film premiered on August 10, 2008 at the Locarno Film Festival. It won the festival's award for Best Direction.

References

External links
 

2008 films
2008 drama films
Canadian drama films
2000s French-language films
Films directed by Denis Côté
French-language Canadian films
2000s Canadian films